The Samuel H. and Isabel Smith Elkins House is a historic home in Columbia, Missouri.  The home is located just north of Downtown Columbia, Missouri on 9th street and today contains an artisan glassworks.  The large two-story brick residence was built about 1882 in the Italianate style.

The property was placed on the National Register of Historic Places in 1996. It is located within the North Village Arts District.

See also
 Maplewood (Columbia, Missouri), another Italianate style home in Columbia, Missouri

References

Houses on the National Register of Historic Places in Missouri
Italianate architecture in Missouri
Houses completed in 1882
Houses in Columbia, Missouri
National Register of Historic Places in Boone County, Missouri